The furlong–firkin–fortnight (FFF) system is a humorous system of units based on unusual or impractical measurements. The length unit of the system is the furlong, the mass unit is the mass of a firkin of water, and the time unit is the fortnight. Like the SI or metre–kilogram–second systems, there are derived units for velocity, volume, mass and weight, etc. It is sometimes referred as FFFF system where the fourth 'F' is degrees Fahrenheit for temperature.

While the FFF system is not used in practice it has been used as an example in discussions of the relative merits of different systems of units. Some of the FFF units, notably the microfortnight, have been used jokingly in computer science. Besides having the meaning "any obscure unit", the derived unit furlongs per fortnight has also served frequently in classroom examples of unit conversion and dimensional analysis.

Base units and definitions

Notable multiples and derived units

Microfortnight and other decimal prefixes 
One microfortnight is equal to 1.2096 seconds. This has become a joke in computer science because in the VMS operating system, the TIMEPROMPTWAIT variable, which holds the time the system will wait for an operator to set the correct date and time at boot if it realizes that the current value is invalid, is set in microfortnights.  This is because the computer uses a loop instead of the internal clock, which has not been activated yet to run the timer. The documentation notes that "[t]he time unit of micro-fortnights is approximated as seconds in the implementation".

The Jargon File reports that the millifortnight (about 20 minutes) and nanofortnight have been occasionally used.

Furlongs per fortnight
One furlong per fortnight is a speed which would be barely noticeable to the naked eye. It converts to: 
 1.663 m/s, (i.e. 0.1663 mm/s),
 roughly 1 cm/min (to within 1 part in 400), 
 5.987 km/h, 
 3.720 mph.

Speed of light
The speed of light is  furlongs per fortnight (1.8026 megafurlongs per microfortnight).

Others
In the FFF system, heat transfer coefficients are conventionally reported as BTU per foot-fathom per degree Fahrenheit per fortnight. Thermal conductivity has units of BTU per fortnight per furlong per degree Fahrenheit.

Like the more common furlongs per fortnight, firkins per fortnight have been used with the meaning "any obscure unit".

See also
 List of unusual units of measurement
 List of humorous units of measurement

Footnotes

References

Systems of units
Tech humour